An acquired taste often refers to an appreciation for a food or beverage that is unlikely to be enjoyed by a person who has not had substantial exposure to it.

Acquired Taste may also refer to:

An Acquired Taste, film by Ralph Arlyck
Acquired Taste, album by Absynthe Minded 2004
Acquired Taste (Delbert McClinton album) 2009
Acquired Taste, album by Junior Giscombe 1985